Igor Pavličić (born 1970 in Belgrade) is a Serbian politician, and former Mayor of the city of Novi Sad representing the Democratic Party (DS). He was elected on 16 June 2008 and served until 14 September 2012. He graduated from the University of Novi Sad Faculty of Law in 1995.

References

1970 births
Living people
Politicians from Belgrade
Mayors of Novi Sad
20th-century Serbian lawyers
Democratic Party (Serbia) politicians
University of Novi Sad alumni
21st-century Serbian lawyers